Kurt Röpke (29 November 1896 – 21 July 1966) was a German general during World War II who commanded several divisions. He was a recipient of the Knight's Cross of the Iron Cross with Oak Leaves of Nazi Germany.

Awards and decorations

 Iron Cross (1939) 2nd Class (3 July 1941) & 1st Class (18 July 1941)
 German Cross in Gold on 9 October 1942 as Oberst in 50th Infantry Regiment
 Knight's Cross of the Iron Cross with Oak Leaves
 Knight's Cross on 18 November 1943 as Generalmajor and commander of 46th Infantry Division
 Oak Leaves on 14 April 1945 as General of Infantry and commander of XXIX Army Corps

References

Citations

Bibliography

1896 births
1966 deaths
Generals of Infantry (Wehrmacht)
German Army personnel of World War I
German prisoners of war in World War II held by the Soviet Union
People from the Rhine Province
Military personnel from Solingen
Recipients of the clasp to the Iron Cross, 1st class
Recipients of the Gold German Cross
Recipients of the Knight's Cross of the Iron Cross with Oak Leaves
German Army generals of World War II